Major James Gowans, DSO (23 April 1872 – 14 March 1936) was an English-born sportsman who played international rugby union as a wing for Scotland and as a cricketer represented Marylebone Cricket Club.

Personal history
Gowans was born in Westoe, South Shields in 1872 to Dr. William Gowans of Westoe House. He was educated at Harrow before matriculating to Clare College, Cambridge in 1890. Gowans joined the British Army as an officer in the Durham Artillery Militia, a militia regiment, where he was promoted to captain on 13 May 1896. He volunteered for active service fighting in South Africa during the Second Boer War, and left Southampton with other men of the regiment in the SS Umbria in March 1900. From March to June 1900 he served in operations around Natal and later around the Zululand Frontier, including the defence of Forts Itala and Prospect, and the following year he was promoted to the rank of major on 9 November 1901. For his actions during the conflict he was mentioned in dispatches (final despatch by Lord Kitchener dated 23 June 1902) and also received the Distinguished Service Order (DSO), the Queen's South Africa Medal with three clasps and the King's South Africa Medal with two clasps.

In 1902 he married Erin Laura Muriel, daughter of William Wheelwright of Durban, and settled in South Africa.

Gowans served his country again during the First World War, serving as a temporary lieutenant colonel in the Royal Field Artillery, and was mentioned in despatches on another two occasions.

Rugby career
Gowans first came to note as a rugby player when he represented Cambridge University whilst a student at Clare College. He played in two Varsity Matches in 1892 and 1893, winning two sporting 'Blues'. Gowans played his rugby on the wing and was first capped for Scotland, while still a Cambridge student, in the 1893 Home Nations Championship, against Wales. His seven others caps for Scotland were also in Home Nations encounters and he took part in their successful 1895 campaign where they claimed their first ever Triple Crown. It was during the 1895 tournament that Gowens scored his first international points, scoring a match winning try in the encounter with Wales. He would score one more try, in his final match, during the 1896 game against England.

Cricket career
In 1891, Gowans played a first-class cricket match for the Marylebone Cricket Club against Cambridge University. Playing as a wicket-keeper, he top scored in their first innings with 40 and wasn't required to bat in the second. The bowler who dismissed him, Cyril Wells, was also a rugby union international, representing England.

References

External links
Cricinfo: James Gowans

See also
 List of Scottish cricket and rugby union players

1872 births
1936 deaths
People educated at Harrow School
Alumni of Clare College, Cambridge
English cricketers
Scottish cricketers
Marylebone Cricket Club cricketers
Scottish rugby union players
English rugby union players
Scotland international rugby union players
Cambridge University R.U.F.C. players
London Scottish F.C. players
Rugby union players from South Shields
Companions of the Distinguished Service Order
British Army personnel of World War I
British Army personnel of the Second Boer War
Royal Field Artillery officers
Anglo-Scots
Rugby union wings